The 2017 international rugby league season started when Hungary played Uruguay in the Western Sydney suburb of Liverpool. The season will also include the 2017 Rugby League World Cup which will be held in Australia, New Zealand and Papua New Guinea during October, November and December.

Men

January
No international matches were played.

February

Notes:
 This was Uruguay's first ever RLIF-sanctioned Test match.
 This was Hungary's first ever Test match win.
 Hungary's Max Feast made his Test debut aged just 16 years and 23 days.

Notes:
 This was Thailand's first ever RLIF-sanctioned Test match.

March
No international matches were played.

April
No international matches were played.

May

June

July

August 

Notes:
 Norway's squad included former Lebanese national representative Gilbert Haydamous.

September

October

November
No international matches were played.

December
No international matches were played.

Women

May

June

September 

Note: This match featured 20 players per side (13 on-field and 7 on the interchange bench) and was played as a curtain-raiser to a men's Prime Minister's XIII match.

October

November

References

2017 in rugby league
Rugby league-related lists